Choe Sang-gon (born 28 April 1953) is a politician of the Democratic People's Republic of Korea. He is a member of the Central Committee of the Workers' Party of Korea and was also a member of the 13th convocation of the Supreme People's Assembly. He serves as Minister of Higher Education in the Cabinet of North Korea and the President of Kim Il-sung University.

Biography
Choe was born on 28 April 1953 in South Hamgyong Province.

In 2014, he served as deputy to the 13th convocation of the Supreme People's Assembly, and in May 2016 he became a member of the 7th convocation of the Central Committee of the Workers' Party of Korea.

References

External links
Photo of Professor, Doctor Choe Sang Gon 

Government ministers of North Korea
Members of the Supreme People's Assembly
Academic staff of Kim Il-sung University
1953 births
People from South Hamgyong
Living people
Members of the 8th Politburo of the Workers' Party of Korea
Members of the 8th Central Committee of the Workers' Party of Korea